The 2003 Kazakhstan Premier League was the 12th season of the Kazakhstan Premier League, the highest football league competition in Kazakhstan, and took place between 12 April and 3 November.

Teams
There were 5 promoted teams to the Premier League for this season, Ekibastuzets, Batys, Dostyk, Taraz and Zhetysu. The Premier League was expanded to 17 teams before the season started and to 19 teams for the 2004 season, this mean no teams were relegated before or after the season. Before the start of the season Vostok Altyn were renamed Vostok and Dostyk became Ordabasy.

Due to failure to comply with UEFA regulations, no teams qualified for any UEFA competition.

Team overview

League table

Results

Season statistics

Top scorers

References

Kazakhstan Premier League seasons
1
Kazakh
Kazakh